Michael Angelo Saltarelli (January 17, 1932 – October 8, 2009) was an American prelate of the Roman Catholic Church. He served as Bishop of Wilmington from 1995 to 2008.  He previously served as an auxiliary bishop of the Archdiocese of Newark in New Jersey from 1990 to 1995.

Biography

Early life 
One of seven children, Michael Saltarelli was born on January 17, 1932, in Jersey City, New Jersey, to Michael and Caroline (née Marzitello) Saltarelli. Former Boston College football player Brian Toal is Michael Saltarelli's grandnephew.

Saltarelli attended James J. Ferris High School in Jersey City and later Seton Hall University in South Orange, New Jersey, where he obtained a Bachelor of Arts degree in 1956. Saltarelli then studied at Immaculate Conception Seminary in Darlington, New Jersey.

Priesthood 
Saltarelli was ordained to the priesthood for the Archdiocese of Newark by Archbishop Thomas Boland on May 28, 1960. Saltarelli first served as an associate pastor at Holy Family Parish in Nutley, New Jersey, from 1960 to 1977, earning a Master of Religious Studies degree from Manhattan College in New York City in 1975. He was then appointed as pastor of Our Lady of Assumption Parish in Bayonne, New Jersey, serving there until 1982.  Saltarelli was then named executive director for pastoral services in the archdiocese. He was raised by the Vatican to the rank of honorary prelate in 1984.

Saltarelli was named pastor of St. Catherine of Siena Parish in Cedar Grove, New Jersey, in June 1985, and vicar for priests in November 1987. He also served as dean of North Essex, Bayonne, and West Essex in New Jersey. He served two terms as a member of and one term as president of the Priests' Personnel Board, and was a member of the archdiocesan school board.

Auxiliary Bishop of Newark 
On June 2, 1990, Saltarelli was appointed auxiliary bishop of the Archdiocese of Newark and Titular Bishop of Mesarfelta by Pope John Paul II. He received his episcopal consecration on July 30, 1990, from then Theodore McCarrick, with Archbishop Peter Gerety and Bishop John Smith serving as co-consecrators. He selected as his episcopal motto: "Obedience to Jesus Christ."

As an auxiliary to Archbishop McCarrick, he served as rector of Sacred Heart Cathedral and continued to serve as Vicar for Priests. He was also the national episcopal moderator of the Holy Name Society and New Jersey State Chaplain of the Knights of Columbus.

Bishop of Wilmington
Saltarelli was named by John Paul II as the eighth bishop of the Diocese of Wilmington on November 21, 1995. He succeeded Bishop Robert E. Mulvee, and was formally installed on January 23, 1996.

During his tenure, Saltarelli oversaw an increase of over 60,000 Catholics in the diocese, ordained 23 priests and 47 permanent deacons, and constructed or renovated numerous churches, schools, and other facilities. He also expanded ministries to Hispanics, and established a group of Delawarean Catholics dedicated to preventing legislation that would legalize cloning and the use of human embryos for medical research. He released the names of 20 diocesan priests accused of sexual abuse, and once said, "I condemn what's been done to victims with all my heart."In 2006, he refused to allow a student center at Archmere Academy in Claymont, Delaware to be named after then-Senator Joe Biden, an Archmere alumnus and pro-choice politician. 

Upon reaching the mandatory retirement age of 75, Saltarelli submitted his resignation to Pope Benedict XVI in January 2007 (however, his year of birth was still publicly listed as 1933, with 1932 not being publicized until after his death). His resignation was accepted by the pope on July 7, 2008, and he served as apostolic administrator of Wilmington until the installation of his successor, Bishop William F. Malooly, on September 8, 2007.

Retirement and legacy
Saltarelli underwent an emergency quadruple-bypass surgery on April 2, 2009.Saltarelli suffered from cancer that started as bone cancer and had spread. Michael Saltarelli died on October 8, 2009, at age 77 in Wilmington, Delaware.

References

1933 births
2009 deaths
Deaths from bone cancer
Deaths from cancer in Delaware
James J. Ferris High School alumni
Roman Catholic bishops of Wilmington
20th-century Roman Catholic bishops in the United States
21st-century Roman Catholic bishops in the United States
Clergy from Jersey City, New Jersey
Seton Hall University alumni
Manhattan College alumni
Catholics from New Jersey